Robina may refer to:

People 
 Robina Courtin (born 1944), Buddhist nun
 Robina Higgins (1915–1990), athlete
 Robina Muqimyar (born 1986), athlete
 Robina Qureshi (born 1964), human rights campaigner
 Robina Suwol, Children's Environmental Health & Justice Advocate
 Robina Williams, author

Places
 Robina, Queensland, a town on the Gold Coast in Australia
 Electoral district of Robina, for the state assembly of Queensland, Australia
 Robina Parkway, Gold Coast, Queensland, Australia
 Robina railway station, Robina, Queensland, Australia
 Robina Town Centre, Robina, Queensland, Australia; a shopping centre
 Robina Town Centre bus station
 Robina Stadium, Robina, Queensland, Australia
 Robina Hospital, Robina, Queensland, Australia

Other 
 Robina (novel), a novel by E. V. Timms

See also

 
 Universal Robina, company
 Robinia, plant genus
 Robin (disambiguation)